Robert James Tait (born 4 October 1938) is a Scottish former professional footballer who played mainly in the Football League as an inside forward.

References

1938 births
Living people
Footballers from Edinburgh
Scottish footballers
Association football inside forwards
Aberdeen F.C. players
Elgin City F.C. players
Notts County F.C. players
Barrow A.F.C. players
Chesterfield F.C. players
Arnold F.C. players
Scottish Football League players
English Football League players